"Burn" is a science fiction novella published in 2005 by James Patrick Kelly.  It won the 2007 Nebula Award for Best Novella.

Plot summary
The story follows Prosper Gregory Leung, a farmer who has been recruited to help fight forest fires on his home planet of Walden. After being injured in the line of duty, he is sent to recover in a hospital. There, he ends up contacting the High Gregory, a young ruler on the planet Kenning. In the course of talking with the High Gregory, Spur unknowingly brings the young "luck maker" and several other young diplomats to Walden.

Footnotes

External links 
 

Short stories by James Patrick Kelly
Nebula Award for Best Novella-winning works
2005 short stories
Tachyon Publications books